Enrique David Mateo (born 21 February 1987) is a Brazilian footballer.

Biography
Born in São Bernardo do Campo, Greater São Paulo, Mateo started his career at São Caetano of São Paulo metropolitan area. In September 2005 he was signed by Fiorentina, and played at Primavera team.

He graduated from U-20 youth team in summer 2007, signing a new 5-year contract. He joined Arezzo but did not play.

He was loaned to Lecco for 2 seasons. Lecco received performance bonus of €18,000 from Fiorentina for the free loan.

On the last day of 2011 summer transfer he was loaned to Campobasso.

References

External links
 Profile at CBF 
 Profile at AIC.Football.it 

Brazilian footballers
Brazilian expatriate footballers
Associação Desportiva São Caetano players
ACF Fiorentina players
S.S. Arezzo players
Calcio Lecco 1912 players
Association football defenders
Expatriate footballers in Italy
People from São Bernardo do Campo
1987 births
Living people
Footballers from São Paulo (state)
21st-century Brazilian people